Laguna de Duero is a municipality located in the province of Valladolid, Castile and León, Spain. According to the 2016 census (INE), the municipality has a population of 22 ,696 inhabitants.

It is the second largest city in Valladolid behind Valladolid City.

Nowadays it is an industrial town situated 7 km away from the capital city of Valladolid. The town has some neighbourhoods distant from the town center like Torrelago or El Villar. The town has three industrial estates, for example, those of Las Lobas or Los Barreros.

The town is surrounded by pine woods and its municipal territory is bathed by the River Douro. What gives a privileged situation to this town, because this made the town into a place rich in wellsprings. However many of them fell into disuse or are abandoned at present. The most important is the Fountain of San Pedro Regalado at the place of El Abrojo.

Toponym 
The name of the town derives from the former enormous salt lagoon which existed in this town. Nowadays only a small portion of it remains in a recently remodelled beautiful environment converted into a park

Geography

Climate 
Laguna de Duero enjoys a Mediterranean continental climate, which is distinct from the Mediterranean sea climate because of the inexistent thermo-regulatory influence from the sea. As a matter of fact, the climate changes are more drastic because of the isolation of the region, which is surrounded by three mountain ranges, and a higher altitude over the sea level.

Nature

The Douro's Canal 
The Douro's canal was constructed in order to supply water to the City of Valladolid during the 19th century by José María de Salamanca y Mayol in 1879. At present, it is a beautiful natural space and is notable for the large number of birds flying over.

The panoramic picture shows the current state of the remaining lagoon, which is a minimal part of the former salt lagoon that existed as late as 1972.

History

Demography 

Laguna de Duero experienced a substantial population growth in the early years of the twentyfirst century. Four percent of the population are immigrants, a lower proportion than the provincial average of about 5.6%.

Politics

Town council 
Political distribution of the Town Council after the municipal election of 2011:

The draw in seats between the PSOE and the PP was solved with an agreement between the latter and the local political party Independientes por Laguna (IL), the PP candidate being appointed as a mayor and the IL candidate as a mayor deputy

Heritage

Church of Nuestra Señora de la Asunción 
The first church appears cited in the archives of the Cathedral of Valladolid and was donated in 1135 by Ermengol VI, count of Urgel, who was the count Pedro Ansúrez's grandson.

Francisco de Mendoza commands to have the church demolished in 1543 and builds up a new church above the latter's remains. The current church is a Gothic-style building with three cross-vaulted naves. Much of the church is constructed in stone, possibly from the  quarry of Campaspero. The belfry tower stands as high as the church's transept and its back part is made of brick. The church floor is made of white marble.

Nuestra Señora del Villar's Chapel 
It is the only remaining chapel of the town, because there were some more in the past. It dates back to the 12th century and is located on a small hill within one km to the west of the town center.

The oldest part of the current temple is the chapelhead, which is square-floored and finished with a semi-polygonal plastered wall and with a star-shaped groin vault; this part was built in the 16th century. There are some paintings telling some legends and miracles related to the holy Virgin on the top of the Main chapel's walls.

Later in the 17th century, the chapel was enlarged by building a new rectangular-floor nave covered with a barrel vault. The façade is a round arch protected by a rectangular portico formed by four columns holding the wooden roof. The sacristy  leans against the left side of the main chapel and the alcove stands behind the presbytery, where the votive offerings are stocked. These latter parts of the chapel are the most recent and were built in the 18th century.

The altarpiece is baroque style and is made of only one body with four solomonic columns decorated with grape bunches and leaves. At the center stands the alcove with a statue of the Virgin Our Lady of the Villar, and on the top of the altarpiece is a painting depicting the coronation of the Virgin. The statue is a 13th-century polychromed wooden sculpture. The Virgin holds the Baby Jesus with her left kneel, both sculptures being in an inexpressive position. The sculpture was maimed several times in order to dress it with a cape. In 1986, the sculpture was restored.

On September 8, the town feasts the Virgin's Nativity with a solemn mass, flower offerings, and a traditional auction for the people to be able to bring the Virgin down the throne and parade with her in a procession around the chapel with people dancing traditional dancings at the rhythm of the Castilian traditional musical instruments like the dulzainas(a kind of Spanish double-reed instrument), the bagpipes,  and  the drums.

Church of San Pedro Regalado 
It is a modern church composed of a central nave and two other lateral ones. A Christ sculpture is found inside the church and which is paraded together with the Santo Cristo de los Trabajos (The holy Christ of the Works) and  Nuestro Padre Jesús Nazareno (Our Father Jesus the Nazarene) in the procession of the Silence on Good Thursday.

Culture House 
It is an early 20th-century building working as a public municipal library since it was bought by the Town Council in 1986. It is commonly called The Hotel and shows a two-storey structure in red brick and is finished with a white stone balustrade on the flat roof.

The Constitution Scultpture 
It was erected in 1982 and is situated at the Constitution Square. Its author is the sculptor José Noja, its name is two entwined hands.

Festivities 
The most outstanding festivities are Las Águedas Day, San Pedro Regalado's Day, La Vieja's Day and the Patron Saint's festivities.

The  Las Águedas Day is celebrated on February 5 in hommage to St Agatha of Sicily.

San Pedro Regalado's Day is celebrated in May.

The celebration of this day has been being celebrated from the ancient times and is very dug in the town. Nobody knows its origin, since there are many theories explaining its true origin. The most accurate theory is that the mule drivers, who covered the route from the capital city of the kingdom to the northern lands, passed the night alongside the cattle on a place known as Prado Boyal (literally the oxen meadow)

The celebration of this festivity coincides with the Lent.

La Vieja was depicted by a figure of an old woman made of carton or wood that had seven legs, each for each Lent week. Each leg was sawed insofar as each week went by. This seven-week period of time must have been too long for the mule drivers, because the Lent involved abstinence and fasting; for this reason they decided to celebrate in the middle of the Lent period. The cattle breeders celebrated this festivity, when they had a rest in Laguna de Duero at the place of Prado Boyal. The inhabitants of Laguna de Duero are supposed to have been passed down this tradition and made this festivity their own. The festivity is celebrated on Wednesday in the middle of the Lent.

Traditionally, the children did not go to school and used to go with a basket resquesting food from a house to another in order to go to have lunch in the afternoon at the pine woods of Los Valles or Guarnicionera. In these times, the most valued contributions were potatoes, eggs and chorizos to make the classic Spanish chorizo omelette.

The Patron Saint festivities are celebrated from September 7 to 11 and are in hommage to Holy Virgin of El Villar. They start off with a speech and as from that moment on the peñistas (member of neighbours associations dedicated to making arrangement for these revelries) go to the chapel of Nuestra Señora del Villar to make flower offerings to the Holy Virgin. The main feast day is September 8, the Patron Saint's Day.

Culture

Education

Laguna de Duero houses the French school of Valladolid, Lycée Français de Castilla y León.

Gastronomy 
Cuisine of the province of Valladolid

Sport 
The most remarkable sport team in Laguna de Duero is its football team, the Club Deportivo Laguna that owns an important history of triumphs in the province of Valladolid. Their most important triumphs are the third division Spanish Football Championship, and the Trophy Deputation of Valladolid. They play their matches at the stadium La Laguna with a capacity of 3,500 people.

The Club de Pelota de Laguna de Duero, in  frontenis (a sport similar to jaialai), achieved several regional and national titles. The members of the Spanish junior male selection of frontenis under the age of 17 years, who achieved the gold medal in the Spanish national championship, come from Laguna de Duero.

There is also a five a side football or indoor soccer school called CD Laguna FS V.V. with a farm team formed by diverse teams for under 10s, under 11s, under 13s and cadets, in addition to a senior team in provincial category and another senior in national category B. These teams play their matches at the sport centers of Laguna de Duero: The municipal sport center with a capacity of 400 people and the sport center La Nava.

There is a handball team too: Balonmano Laguna.

References

Bibliography 
 MARTÍN GONZÁLEZ, Juan José. Catálogo Monumental. Antiguo Partido Judicial de Valladolid, tomo VI. Diputación Provincial de Valladolid. Reedición año 2000.
 CASTELLANOS CUESTA, Margarita. Ermita de Nuestra Señora del Villar Laguna de Duero. Diputación Provincial de Valladolid, año 2012.

External links 
 Ayuntamiento de Laguna de Duero (Town Council's website in Spanish)
 Equipo de fútbol sala(Five a side football or indoor soccer local team's website in Spanish)

Municipalities in the Province of Valladolid